Osage Hills State Park is a  Oklahoma state park It is located in eastern Osage County, Oklahoma. The nearest cities are Pawhuska and Bartlesville. The park offers outdoor recreation opportunities including camping, hiking, fishing and wildlife watching. Park facilities include picnic tables and shelters, 20 semi-modern RV campsites, 16 tent sites and 8 cabins. Several of the park's structures are historic parkitecture built by the Civilian Conservation Corps during the 1930s and 1940s.

History
Osage Hills State Park is one of the seven original parks constructed for the State of Oklahoma by members of the Civilian Conservation Corps (CCC). Construction began in 1935. The CCC workers were housed at the north end of the park. The remnants of the housing area still visible include concrete and rock foundations, an amphitheater and a lone chimney. The workers built structures using stone and timber that were obtained locally. Their design was based on “naturalistic architecture,” similar to that used in other parks built by the U. S. Government during the 1930s and 40s. Eight guest cabins are still used today. Although their appearance is the same as when they were built, they have all been modernized with energy-saving appliances and air conditioning.

The park also has a large picnic shelter that is suitable for use by large groups. It has a kitchen, a large dining area, and two stone fireplaces on opposite sides of the building.

Recreation
Abundant fishing for bass, crappie, catfish, and perch can be found in Lookout Lake, or in Sand Creek at the south end of the park.  Miles of hiking trails cross the park offering opportunities for beginning hikers or more challenging paths.  Wildlife is abundant in the park and includes whitetail deer, wild turkey, bobcat, raccoon, and more.

Other facilities include hiking trails and a swimming pool. There are also tent campgrounds and recreational vehicle (RV) parking areas.

Fees
To help fund a backlog of deferred maintenance and park improvements, the state implemented an entrance fee for this park and 21 others effective June 15, 2020.  The fees, charged per vehicle, start at $10 per day for a single-day or $8 for residents with an Oklahoma license plate or Oklahoma tribal plate.  Fees are waived for honorably discharged veterans and Oklahoma residents age 62 & older and their spouses.  Passes good for three days or a week are also available; annual passes good at all 22 state parks charging fees are offered at a cost of $75 for out-of-state visitors or $60 for Oklahoma residents.  The 22 parks are:
 Arrowhead Area at Lake Eufaula State Park
 Beavers Bend State Park
 Boiling Springs State Park
 Cherokee Landing State Park
 Fort Cobb State Park
 Foss State Park
 Honey Creek Area at Grand Lake State Park
 Great Plains State Park
 Great Salt Plains State Park
 Greenleaf State Park
 Keystone State Park
 Lake Eufaula State Park
 Lake Murray State Park
 Lake Texoma State Park
 Lake Thunderbird State Park
 Lake Wister State Park
 Natural Falls State Park
 Osage Hills State Park
 Robbers Cave State Park
 Sequoyah State Park
 Tenkiller State Park
 Twin Bridges Area at Grand Lake State Park

References

State parks of Oklahoma
Protected areas of Osage County, Oklahoma